Benjamin Gates may refer to:

Benjamin Franklin Gates, fictional character and protagonist of the National Treasure franchise
Benjamin Gates (Vermont politician) (1873–1943), Vermont attorney
Benjamin Franklin Gates (1801–1881), early settler of the town of Barre, New York, and first owner of the now-historic Benjamin Franklin Gates House